Raj Steven (2 August 1984) is an Azerbaijani photographer, mentor and storyteller.

Biography 
Raj Steven was born in Sumgayit on 2 August 1984. He entered the Middle School in 1990. Although his father was of German descent, he worked in one of the power structures in the Soviet era. His mother was a music teacher from the West Azerbaijan region. Whenever he talked about himself, he said, "I do not come from two sides". When he enters high school, his mother, who is a music teacher, sends him to a 5-year piano class. He takes piano lessons here. begins to love.

It is no coincidence that when he wins the morning piano competition, they give him a visor-branded camera with a ribbon as a gift. After that, he starts taking pictures every day with that camera. Although he chooses to be an architect, he secretly chooses the field of photography, not this field. Thus, he wins a university in the Republic of Turkey to study photography. Therefore, never wants war and is never interested in war photography. Because the images that his father wrote in his memory in the war zones he traveled to make him do it. He shows interest in learning other languages as well as his own. As he said in his speech, he is an amateur.

Because he was born into a German family, growing up between two civilizations is always very mixed. Growing up between two cultures will shape him as a STORYTELLER in the future. If there are any events that he fears, Raj Steven will strengthen the side of the storytellers in the background of these events. In addition to his knowledge of English and German, he is fluent in Persian while serving in the Peacekeeping Forces in Afghanistan. He is also interested in the language he learned after his military service at different times.

His reluctance to talk about himself is overwhelmed by his one-man expression.

A word he always says in seminars never escapes the attention of his students. In his opinion, photographers write history.

Whether in politics or in other respects, he always takes a neutral position. He considers capitalism a bastard. Raj Steven always affirms his belief in Islam by saying, "The religion that prevents the burial of virgins alive must be absolutely sacred".He believes that all people are dogmas. With the field of photography he studied, he taught both virtual and real teaching to people who love the field of photography living in Azerbaijan, Iran, Turkey, and Central Asian countries.
The students he raised in his own country are well known and successful. Raj Steven has been researching and interested in Psychology and Sociology for the last 3 years. He is currently writing a book on social health in Azerbaijani.

Career

Photography career 
In 2001, he entered the Photography Department at the Mimar Sinan Fine Arts University in Istanbul, Turkey, and in 2005, he successfully completed his study. In 2005–2006, he participated to master classes in Sweden to study innovations in the art of photography. Starting from 2006, he began professional actions in the field of photography. In 2006–2007, he visited the Islamic Republic of Iran for a dissertation in the field of photography, were acquainted with the culture, way of life, customs, and traditions of the local and minority peoples living there and masterfully reflected all these in his photos.

In 2007, he went to Turkey and started to continue his actions in the field of photography in there. Besides this, he became closely acquainted with and learned program languages, sociology, and psychology took lessons from professional teachers in this area. Returning to Baku in October 2009, he began to operate for ANS Press TV and Radio Broadcasting Company in his own field. He started his own business in 2010 and in the same year, he founded a company named "Silver" and continues to operate to this day. He continued to contribute to his own success by participating in domestic exhibitions.

Since 2016, he has been engaged in teaching the sociological and psychological aspects of photography.

In 2017, he had held a master class on "Architectural photography" in Istanbul, Turkey, and in 2018, a master class on "Photo technics" organized by the company  "Canon Azerbaijan".

In 2018, he established the "Raj Steven school" School of Photography. During the spring and autumn months of the year, for two months, he professionally educates the secrets and subtleties of the art of photography to amateurs and young people who want to learn this art in depth. To date, hundreds of students have taken advantage of this opportunity, and many of them are now taking their places in this arena.

In 2018–2019, he had taught in the "Photoman" project organized by "ASAN Azerbaijan". Starting from 2019, he is preparing for the exhibition, which he plans to present in the future. In 2020, he participated and made a speech in a conference on photography in Dubai, UAE (United Arab Emirates).

Raj Steven is dealing with a professional manner architecture and fashion photography.

Published works
 2014 — "Discovery Azerbaijan" – Azerbaijan nature.
 2016 — "V-Nine Fashion Project"

Awards 
 2012 — "The most beautiful picture of nature taken in the mountains" with the group named "PHOTOPEAK" which contains four persons — APU (Azerbaijan Photographers Union).
 2013 — "Best Picture" nomination from "Discovery Azerbaijan" magazine.
 2014 – Winner of the competition organized by the  "Youth Foundation"
 2015 – 1st place at competitions organized by Internet sites for 10 years. Besides this, since 2001, it has achieved success in competitions and exhibitions abroad.

References

External links 
 Instagram account
 Raj Steven Official site
 
 
 
 "Аромат любви" азербайджанского певца (ВИДЕО)
 «Artist girl»: Азербайджанская художница снялась в пикантной фотосессии
 В ходе работы над видео фотографом Раджом Стивеном была снята промо-фотосесия клипа "Sevgi ətri" с участием главных героев видео П.Абдуллаева и Н.Эфендиевой, над образами которых работали стилисты Эльнур Гасанов и Пярвиз Велизаде.

Azerbaijani photographers
Azerbaijani educators
Storytellers
Living people
1984 births
People from Sumgait